Hattersheim am Main is a town in the Main-Taunus district, Hesse (Germany) and part of the Frankfurt Rhein-Main urban area.

Geography

Neighbouring towns
Hattersheim borders the city of Frankfurt in the northeast, in the southeast with Kelsterbach, in the southwest with Raunheim (both are in the district of Groß-Gerau). The western neighboring towns are Flörsheim, Hofheim and Kriftel.

Town districts
In 1972 the villages of Okriftel und Eddersheim, both situated next to the river Main, were incorporated into Hattersheim. Since then the town has been called Hattersheim am Main. Hattersheim consists of three districts: Eddersheim, Hattersheim und Okriftel.

Eddersheim
4944 people lived here in 2004. There is a lock on the river Main near the village's center.
The engineer and inventor Anton Flettner was born in Eddersheim.

Okriftel
7561 people lived here in 2007. You can cross the river Main by ferry. The town on the other side of the river is Kelsterbach. The ferry boat operates in summer time on Sundays.

History
A former industrial chocolate production of Sarotti chocolate and the Sarotti-Moor (Mohr) took place in Hattersheim am Main. With the change of the majority stockholding, in 1929, the factory merged to Nestlé. The factory in Hattersheim was in the 1960s one of the biggest companies in Hattersheim and Main-Taunus district with a workforce up to 2,000 workers. The factory was closed down in 1994 and currently it was designated a historic site in Hesse.

Population
(as of 31 December)
1998 – 24,687 
1999 – 24,756
2000 – 24,752
2001 – 24,858
2002 – 25,093
2003 – 25,059
2004 – 25,161
2019 – 27,674

Twin towns – sister cities

Hattersheim am Main is twinned with:
 Mosonmagyaróvár, Hungary
 Santa Catarina, Cape Verde
 Sarcelles, France

Notable people
Anton Flettner (1885–1961), inventor

References

External links
 (de/en/fr/hu)

Towns in Hesse
Main-Taunus-Kreis
Populated places on the Main basin
Populated riverside places in Germany